In the 2013–14 season, Greek football club Panetolikos F.C. played in the Greek Super League after being relegated to second-tier Football League for a season.

For the first time in its history, Panetolikos secured a comfortable position allowing the team to stay in Greece's top league. At the end of the season, the club finished eighth.

Players

Competitions

Super League Greece

League table

References

Panetolikos
Panetolikos F.C. seasons